Ingham is a small village and civil parish in the English county of Norfolk.

For the purposes of local government, the parish falls within the district of North Norfolk.

There are the remains of a priory and the Ingham Poor's Allotment.

History
Ingham is mentioned in the Domesday Book of 1086 as the village of Hincham in the hundred of Happing. Possible etymologies are "homestead or village of [a man called] Inga" or "home of the Inguiones" (an ancient Germanic tribe).

The Lordship of Ingham was possessed at a very early date by the Ingham family. An Oliver de Ingham was living in 1183 and a John de Ingham is known to have been Lord in the reign of Richard I. The great grandson of John, the distinguished Oliver Ingham lived here and his son-in-law Miles Stapleton of Bedale, Yorkshire, inherited jure uxoris.

Ingham Old Hall has its origins in the medieval times having been built circa 1320. In the 14th century the Hall was inhabited by the local Lord of the Manor, Sir Miles Stapleton, whose tomb stands in Ingham's Holy Trinity church alongside that of his father in law, Sir Oliver de Ingham.

Amenities
The village has one public house, The Ingham Swan, which is one of only two public houses tied to the Woodforde's Brewery of Woodbastwick in Norfolk. The original building was built in the 14th century and was part of Ingham Priory until its destruction under Henry VIII in the 16th century. In spring 2010 chef Daniel Smith and business partner Gregory Adjemian took ownership of the pub, renaming it as The Ingham Swan to avoid confusion with The Swan in nearby Stalham. The building has had much interior renovation.

References

External links

Information from Genuki Norfolk on Ingham.
More information on Ingham.
The Ingham Swan website.
The Ingham Swan email subscription link.

External links

North Norfolk
Villages in Norfolk
Civil parishes in Norfolk